Paul Galvin may refer to:

Paul Galvin (Gaelic footballer) (born 1980), Kerry Gaelic footballer
Paul Galvin (businessman) (1895–1959), founder of Motorola